Pokrovka is a rural locality (a selo) in Korotoyakskoye Rural Settlement, Ostrogozhsky District, Voronezh Oblast, Russia. The population was 1,746 as of 2010. There are 23 streets.

References 

Rural localities in Ostrogozhsky District